Diurideae is a tribe of orchid in the subfamily Orchidoideae. It contains about 40 accepted genera. , its division into subtribes remained unclear.

Genera
Chase et al. (2015) accepted the following genera. Some have since been combined.

Acianthus  R.Br.
Adenochilus  Hook.f.
Aporostylis  Rupp & Hatch
Arthrochilus  F.Muell.
Burnettia  Lindl.
Caladenia  R.Br.
Caleana  R.Br.
Calochilus  R.Br.
Chiloglottis  R.Br.
Coilochilus  Schltr.
Corybas  Salisb.
Cryptostylis  R.Br.
Cyanicula  Hopper & A.P.Brown = Caladenia
Cyrtostylis  R.Br.
Diuris  Sm.
Drakaea  Lindl.
Elythranthera  (Endl.) A.S.George
Epiblema  R.Br.
Ericksonella  Hopper & A.P.Br.
Eriochilus  R.Br.
Genoplesium  R.Br.
Glossodia  R.Br.
Leporella  A.S.George
Leptoceras  (R.Br.) Lindl.
Lyperanthus  R.Br.
Megastylis  (Schltr.) Schltr.
Microtis  R.Br.
Orthoceras  R.Br.
Paracaleana  Blaxell = Caleana
Pheladenia  D.L.Jones & M.A.Clem.
Praecoxanthus  Hopper & A.P.Brown
Prasophyllum  R.Br.
Pyrorchis  D.L.Jones & M.A.Clements
Rhizanthella  R.S.Rogers
Rimacola  Rupp
Spiculaea  Lindl.
Stigmatodactylus  Maxim. ex Makino
Thelymitra  J.R.Forst. & G.Forst.
Townsonia  Cheeseman
Waireia  D.L.Jones

References

External links 

 
Orchidoideae tribes